Graham Charles Walker  (born 1948) is an American biologist, notable for his work explicating the structure and function of proteins involved in DNA repair and mutagenesis, with applications for cancer, and for understanding rhizobium (bacterial) functions that infect plants and mammals.

In addition to his scientific achievements, Walker is coordinating a program at MIT to develop curricular materials in biology.

Biography
Walker earned a B.Sc. degree from Carleton University, and his Ph.D. in 1974 from the University of Illinois.  He did postdoctoral work at the University of Illinois and at University of California, Berkeley with Bruce Ames.

He is currently a professor at MIT.

Notable publications
 Errol C. Friedberg, Graham C. Walker, Wolfram Siede, and Richard D. Wood, DNA Repair and Mutagenesis (2005 edition of notable textbook)
 Bradley T. Smith, Alan D. Grossman, and Graham C. Walker, "Visualization of Mismatch Repair in Bacterial Cells", Molecular Cell, v.8, pp. 1197–1206 (Dec. 2001)
 LeVier, K., Phillips, R.W., Grippe, V.K., Roop II, R.M. and Walker, G.C. Similar requirements of a plant symbiont and a mammalian pathogen for prolonged intracellular survival. Science 287:2492-2493 (2000)
 G. C. Walker, "Mutagenesis and inducible responses to deoxyribonucleic acid damage in Escheriscia coli", Microbiological Reviews (full text available at PubMed Central)

Awards
 1970 - Woodrow Wilson National Fellow
 1978-1982 - Rita Allen Foundation Scholar
 1994 - Elected Fellow, American Academy of Microbiology
 2004 - Elected Fellow, American Academy of Arts and Sciences.
 2006 - Environmental Mutagen Society Award
 2009 - Elected Fellow, American Association for the Advancement of Science.
 2013 - Elected Member, National Academy of Sciences.
 American Cancer Society Research Professor
 Charles Ross Scholar Award for Cancer Research
 Arthur C. Smith Award
 Stone Lectureship, Pennsylvania State University

References
 MIT faculty profile
 HHMI profile

Footnotes

Howard Hughes Medical Investigators
Living people
1948 births
Carleton University alumni
University of California, Berkeley people
Massachusetts Institute of Technology School of Science faculty
University of Illinois alumni
Members of the United States National Academy of Sciences
Fellows of the American Academy of Arts and Sciences
Fellows of the American Association for the Advancement of Science
21st-century American biologists